Laze pri Vačah is a small settlement east of Vače in the Municipality of Litija in central Slovenia. The area is part of the traditional region of Upper Carniola. It is now included with the rest of the municipality in the Central Sava Statistical Region.

Name
The name of the settlement was changed from Laze to Laze  pri Vačah in 1955.

References

External links

Laze pri Vačah on Geopedia

Populated places in the Municipality of Litija